Sturla Andreas Blanck Torkildsen (born 18 July 1981 in Oslo) is a Norwegian épée fencer. Torkildsen represented Norway at the 2008 Summer Olympics in Beijing, where he competed in the men's individual épée event. He first defeated Venezuela's Wolfgang Mejías in the preliminary round of sixty-four, before losing out his next match to Italy's Matteo Tagliariol, with a score of 10–15.

Torkildsen is a member of Njård, a local fencing club in Oslo, and is also a graduate of law at the University of Oslo.

References

External links
Profile – FIE
NBC 2008 Olympics profile

1981 births
Living people
Sportspeople from Oslo
Norwegian male épée fencers
Olympic fencers of Norway
Fencers at the 2008 Summer Olympics
University of Oslo alumni
21st-century Norwegian people